Timouria is a monotypic genus of flowering plants belonging to the family Poaceae. The only species is Timouria saposhnikowii.

Its native range is Central Asia to Mongolia and North China.

References

Poaceae
Monotypic Poaceae genera